Chibabava District is a district of Sofala Province in Mozambique. The principal town is 
Chibabava. The district is located in the south of the province, and borders with Buzi District in the north, Machanga District in the southeast, with Machaze and Mossurize Districts of Manica Province in the west, and with Sussundenga District of Manica Province in the northwest. It has a population of 101,667 as of 2007.

Geography
The principal rivers in the district are the Buzí River, the Revué River, and the Lucito River.

The climate of the district is tropical humid in the east, close to the coast, and tropical semi-arid dry in the interior.

Demographics
As of 2005, 43% of the population of the district was younger than 15 years. 16% of the population spoke Portuguese. The most common mothertongue among the population was Cindau. 85% were analphabetic, mostly women.

Administrative divisions
The district is divided into three postos, Chibabava (two localities), Goonda (two localities), and Muxúngue (two localities).

Economy
Less than 1% of the households in the district have access to electricity.

Agriculture
In the district, there are 13,000 farms which have on average  of land. The main agricultural products are corn, cassava, cowpea, peanut, sorghum, and sweet potato.

Transportation
There is also an airfield.

References

Districts in Sofala Province